The biblical term "proselyte" is an anglicization of the Koine Greek term προσήλυτος (proselytos), as used in the Septuagint (Greek Old Testament) for "stranger", i.e. a "newcomer to Israel"; a "sojourner in the land", and in the Greek New Testament for a first-century convert to Judaism, generally from Ancient Greek religion. It is a translation of the Biblical Hebrew phrase גר תושב (ger toshav). "Proselyte" also has the more general meaning in English of a new convert to any particular religion or doctrine.

History of the proselyte in Israel
The Law of Moses made specific regulations regarding the admission into Israel's community of such as were not born Israelites.

The New Testament makes mention of proselytes in synagogues. The name proselyte occurs in the New Testament only in Matthew and Acts. The name by which they are commonly designated is that of "devout men", or men "fearing God", or "worshipping God", "fearers of Heaven" or "God-fearers".

On the historical meaning of the Greek word, in chapter 2 of the apocryphal gospel Acts of Pilate (roughly dated from 150 to 400 CE), Annas and Caiaphas define "proselyte" for Pilate:

In Judaism

There are two kinds of proselytes in Rabbinic Judaism: ger tzedek (righteous proselytes, proselytes of righteousness, religious proselyte, devout proselyte) and ger toshav (resident proselyte, proselytes of the gate, limited proselyte, half-proselyte).

A "righteous proselyte" is a gentile who has converted to Judaism, is bound to all the doctrines and precepts of the Jewish religion, and is considered a full member of the Jewish people. The proselyte is circumcised as an adult (milah l'shem giur), if male, and immerses in a mikvah to formally effect the conversion.

A "gate proselyte" is a resident alien who lives in the Land of Israel and follows some of the Jewish customs. They are not required to be circumcised nor to comply with the whole of the Torah. They are bound only to conform to the Seven Laws of Noah (do not worship idols, do not blaspheme God's name, do not murder, do not commit fornication (immoral sexual acts), do not steal, do not tear the limb from a living animal, and do not fail to establish rule of law) to be assured of a place in the world to come.

In early Christianity

The "religious proselytes" spoken of in Early Christian writings were likely righteous proselytes rather than gate proselytes. There is some debate however as to whether proselytes known as God-fearers (Phoboumenoi) and/or Worshippers (Sebomenoi), who were baptized but not circumcised, fall into the righteous or gate category. The New Testament uses the word four times, exclusively referring to converts to Judaism, and never referring to conversion to Christianity.

See also
 Anusim
 Gerim
 Noahidism
 Sons of Noah

References

External links

BeJewish.org

AskNoah.org - United Noahide Academies
Noahide.org - Institute of Noahide Law
HaMikdash.com - The Responsibilities of the Gentiles
BneiNoach.org - Noachide Resource Center
Noachide.org.uk - Bnai Noach in the UK
Free Online Book: 'The Path of the Righteous Gentile'
Gentiles and Circumcision
Godfearers in the City of Love Biblical Archaeology Review

Beginners and newcomers
Christian terminology
Cultural assimilation
Early Christianity and Judaism
Hebrew words and phrases in the Hebrew Bible
Jewish courts and civil law
New Testament Greek words and phrases
Noahides
Religious conversion
Septuagint words and phrases